Sleipner Glacier, is a glacier in eastern Greenland. 

This glacier was named after Sleipner, Odin's mythical eight-legged flying horse.

Geography 
The Sleipner Glacier originates in central Odinland, a heavily glaciated peninsula. It flows westward just west of Ensom Majestaet ('Lonely Majesty'), Odinland's highest point. The glacier is roughly east–west oriented and joins the left side of the Fimbul Glacier just north of its terminus in the Bernstorff Fjord (Kangertittivaq). Together the Sleipner and Fimbul glaciers produce massive amounts of ice that blocks the fjord.

Bibliography
Climate-related glacier fluctuations in southeast Greenland

See also
List of glaciers in Greenland

References

External links
Satellite map of Sleipner
Glaciers of Greenland
Odinland